Graziano Boscacci (born 15 November 1969 in Albosaggia) is an Italian ski mountaineer. His son Michele is also competing in ski mountaineering.

Selected results 
 1997:
 1st, Trofeo "Rinaldo Maffeis" (together with Ivan Murada)
 1998:
 3rd, Sellaronda Skimarathon (together with Ivan Murada)
 1999:
 1st, Trofeo "Rinaldo Maffeis" (together with Ivan Murada)
 2nd, Sellaronda Skimarathon (together with Ivan Murada)
 2000:
 7th (and 2nd in "seniors II" ranking), Patrouille des Glaciers ("seniors II" ranking), together with Ivan Murada and Camillo Vescovo
 2001:
 1st, Sellaronda Skimarathon (together with Ivan Murada)
 1st, Tour du Rutor (together with Ivan Murada)
 2002:
 1st, World Championship team race (together with Ivan Murada)
 3rd, Sellaronda Skimarathon (together with Ivan Murada)
 4th, World Championship combination ranking
 2003:
 2nd, Sellaronda Skimarathon (together with Claudio Ruffalini)
 7th, European Championship single race
 2004:
 2nd, World Championship relay race (together with Carlo Battel, Martin Riz and Guido Giacomelli)
 2005:
 2nd, European Championship team race (together with Ivan Murada)
 2006:
 3rd, Adamello Ski Raid (together with Guido Giacomelli and Daniele Pedrini)
 2007:
 3rd, Sellaronda Skimarathon (together with Ivan Murada)
 2008:
 1st, Italian Cup
 2nd, Sellaronda Skimarathon (together with Ivan Murada)
 2011:
 2nd, Sellaronda Skimarathon (together with Daniele Pedrini)

Pierra Menta 

 1995: 9th, together with Ivan Murada
 1998: 6th, together with Ivan Murada
 1999: 4th, together with Ivan Murada
 2000: 5th, together with Ivan Murada
 2001: 2nd, together with Ivan Murada
 2002: 1st, together with Ivan Murada
 2003: 5th, together with Ivan Murada
 2004: 5th, together with Ivan Murada
 2005: 4th, together with Ivan Murada
 2006: 7th, together with Ivan Murada

Trofeo Mezzalama 

 1999: 3rd, together with Ivan Murada and Luca Negroni
 2001: 1st, together with Ivan Murada and Heinz Blatter
 2003: 5th, together with Ivan Murada and Heinz Blatter
 2007: 5th, together with Ivan Murada and Mirco Mezzanotte
 2009: 4th, together with Ivan Murada and Pietro Lanfranchi

References

External links 
 Graziano Boscacci at SkiMountaineering.org
 Boscacci & Murada at PlanetMountain.com

1969 births
Living people
Italian male ski mountaineers
World ski mountaineering champions
Sportspeople from the Province of Sondrio